The Palazzo del Giardino (Garden Palace) or Palazzo Ducale del Giardino (Ducal Garden Palace) is a historic palace in the Parco Ducale in Parma. It is not to be confused with the official Parma residence of Marie Louise, Duchess of Parma between Palazzo della Pilotta and Palazzo della Provincia in what is now known as piazzale della Pace - she also lived at the Ducal Palace of Colorno and in the Casino dei Boschi in Sala Baganza. The main Ducal Palace in Parma, the Palazzo della Pilotta and the Reinach Theater were all destroyed in bombing on 13 May 1944.

Presently, the Palazzo del Giardino houses Parma's Provincial Carabinieri Command and the Carbinieri's Reparto investigazioni scientifiche (RIS). It is due to house a local office for the European Food Safety Authority.

History 

Construction of a palace at the site was commissioned in 1561 by Duke Ottavio Farnese, who needed to establish a fixed base for the court of his Duchy of Parma and Piacenza. He chose a site near a defensive turret designed by the Sforza, and commissioned Jacopo Barozzi and Giovanni Francesco Testa respectively to design the building  and to manage construction. The palace design was modelled on the contemporary buildings owned by the Farnese family, including the Palazzo Farnese in Rome and Villa Farnese in Florence.

The palace interiors were decorated by artists such as Girolamo Mirola, Jacopo Zanguidi (known as il Bertoja), Agostino Carracci, Carlo Cignani, Jan Soens, Cesare Baglioni, Giovanni Battista Trotti (known as "il Malosso") and Luca Reti. The building was already being modified and extended early in the 17th century, first by Simone Moschino and then by Girolamo Rainaldi, who added courtyards and side wings added to the original rectangular floorplan.

Giovanni Boscoli designed a large fountain in front of the new palace, with several statues and water features - Vitellozzo Vitelli argued in a letter to Pico della Mirandola that it was superior to that at the Palazzo Farnese in Caprarola. The Palazzo del Giardino reached its greatest magnificence during the reign of Ranuccio I Farnese, but was progressively neglected under his son Odoardo I Farnese, who was distracted from court life by military campaigns. The ducal court used it until the second half of the 17th century, when they moved to other palaces alongside Palazzo della Pilotta. In the 1680s and 1690s the new duke Ranuccio II Farnese again began to renovate the palace and the ducal gardens. In the 17th century these renovations were mainly to designs by the French architect Ennemond Alexandre Petitot, who also demolished the fountain, which had become insanitary.

After Italian unification the palace housed to an infantry training school. It was badly damaged in an air raid during the Second World War. On 9 September 1943, the school's commander colonel Gaetano Ricci refused German demands to surrender, leading to a battle which the Germans won after calling in armoured vehicles, with five dead and twenty wounded on the Italian side, now commemorated by a marble plaque on the palazzo. The building was left open to vandals after the battle, leaving it devastated by the war's end. Post-war rebuilding became entangled in bureaucracy even after the Palazzo became a base for the Comando della Legione of the Carabinieri - reconstruction work on the completely-destroyed south-west wing only began in 1959 and was completed in 1968. A number of restoration and improvement projects have occurred since 2004, some with lottery funding.

Artworks 
On the ground floor are works by the early 17th-century artist Cesare Baglioni. A monumental 17th-century staircase leads to a large salone on the first floor, named the Sala degli Uccelli after its stucco and fresco decoration of 224 species of birds by Benigno Bossi. Other rooms open off this salone - they house various frescoes and stucco-work from the Farnese era:

 Sala di Alcina - The oldest room in the palace, with circa 1568 frescoes by Girolamo Mirola, with collaboration from Jacopo Zanguidi, showing scenes from book VI of Orlando Furioso 
 Sala dell'Aetas Felicior (or "Sala del Bacio") - Fresco by Zanguidi, 1570-1573, with scenes of Venus and Cupid; named after the Latin inscription Aetas Felicior on the freize running along the ceiling and the dancing scene with a kiss (bacio) glimpsed among crystal columns, a typical creation of late Mannerism, where the space is exploited as a means of naturalistic illusion.
 Sala d'Orfeo - Frescoes by Mirola and Zanguidi, 1568-1570, with scenes of the love story of Orpheus between architectonic figures.
 Sala di Erminia - Frescoes by the Bolognese artist Alessandro Tiarini, 1628, with scenes from Gerusalemme liberata and stucco work of tangled branches by Carlo Bossi.
 Sala dell'Amore - Ceiling frescoes by Agostino Carracci showing maternal love (Venus looking at her son Aeneas as he heads for Italy), heavenly love (Venus and Mars) and human love (Peleus and Thetis); he died in 1602, leaving the work to be completed in 1679-80 by Carlo Cignani with other scenes on the theme of love.
 Sala delle Leggende - The window side of the room shows two frescoes by the Flemish artist Jan Soens, whilst the other three sides have 1604-1619 frescoes by Giovan Battista Trotti (Jupiter Crowning Bacchus, Accompanied by Venus, The Sacrifice of Alcestis and Circe Turning Ulysses' Companions Back Into Men).

References

Bibliography 
  Dante Zucchelli e Renzo Fedocci, Il Palazzo Ducale di Parma, Artegrafica Silva, Parma 1980

External links
  Il palazzo di Ottavio Farnese - profile by ITIS Galilei di Parma

Palaces in Parma
Baroque architecture in Italy
Neoclassical architecture in Italy
House of Farnese
Farnese residences